The Toot Oilfield is an oilfield in the Pothohar Plateau of northern Pakistan. The field was discovered in the early 1960s. Pakistan Petroleum and Pakistan Oilfields explored the field in 1961, and in 1964 the first well was drilled. Commercial production started in 1967.

In 2005, the Vancouver-based International Sovereign Energy signed a memorandum of understanding with the Oil and Gas Development Company Limited, Pakistan's national oil company, to develop the Toot field.

See also

Fuel extraction in Pakistan

References

Oil fields of Pakistan
Natural gas fields in Pakistan